Erin Williams, professionally known as Erin Lucas, (born October 24, 1984) is an American businesswoman, model and television personality. She is the founder and creative director of interior design studio, House of Lucas. She is also the daughter of AC/DC bassist, Cliff Williams.

Life and career
Erin Lucas was born as Erin Williams. She uses her brother's name as her surname. She is the daughter of Georganne and Cliff Williams, bass guitarist of AC/DC. As a child, she spent a lot of time touring with her father's band. In 2007, she graduated from New York University with a Bachelor's degree in Media, Culture and Communication and worked as a talent liaison and project coordinator with One Model Management. She received her Associate of Arts degree in Interior Design from Fashion Institute of Design & Merchandising in Los Angeles.

In 2008, she became a cast member of the MTV reality television show, The City, a spinoff of The Hills, where she reunited with long-time friend Whitney Port. She relocated to Los Angeles after the series' conclusion. She hosts Sex & Relationships on CurrentTV.

Filmography

References

External links
 Erin Lucas on Twitter

1984 births
Living people
American people of English descent
American female models
New York University alumni
Participants in American reality television series
21st-century American women